David Dickinson is an American scholar in educational development, strategy and understanding, currently the Margaret Cowan Chair at Vanderbilt University.  He graduated from Harvard Graduate School of Education.

References

Year of birth missing (living people)
Living people
Vanderbilt University faculty
Harvard Graduate School of Education alumni